WTBI is a non-commercial Religious station serving the Upstate, including Greenville and Spartanburg, as well as Anderson, South Carolina.  The station carries Southern Gospel music and various preaching/teaching programs.  Its current slogan is "The Bright Spot on Your Radio Dial."

WTBI-FM broadcasts 24 hours a day on 91.5 FM with an ERP of 22.5 kW.

Station history
WTBI is owned by Tabernacle Baptist Church (Tabernacle Ministries) in Greenville, South Carolina.  The station airs a mix of Southern Gospel music and preaching from Fundamental, Independent Baptist churches.  Much of the preaching and teaching programming is produced by churches in the Greenville area, in Pickens County, and from various churches in the Appalachian Mountains area.  Other churches from other parts of the United States also produce programs, and these churches are usually affiliated with Tabernacle.  The station also features Sunday, Wednesday, and other special worship services from Tabernacle Baptist Church. Its tower site is located at the campus of Tabernacle Ministries.

Until 2020, WTBI-FM simulcast with daytime-only WTBI 1540 AM, which primarily serves Pickens County, South Carolina.  WTBI was the original station, signing on in 1984, with WTBI-FM being added at 91.7 FM in 1991 as a simulcast.

Change from 91.7 to 91.5
On December 13, 2007, WTBI-FM changed frequencies from 91.7 to 91.5 and increased its ERP from 3,700 watts to 22,500 watts. This allows for better coverage in the Anderson area, as well as the Spartanburg area (which was previously affected by interference from WSGE in the Charlotte area).  With this increase, the purpose for WTBI-AM is enhanced due to the stronger signal in to Pickens County, where the signal was once difficult to receive on 91.7. The AM station still serves an important service in the Blue Ridge Mountains of North Georgia, Western North Carolina and North Western South Carolina.

WTBI (AM)
WTBI began broadcasting under Tabernacle's ownership on January 24, 1984, while founding pastor, Dr. Harold B. Sightler was pastoring the church.  WTBI, 1540 am (originally WPKZ) was the original radio station operated by the church, with the FM station simulcast being added in early 1991.

WTBI broadcasts on 1540 AM with a power of 10,000 watts day and 1,000 watts critical hours. Until 2020, 1540 AM simulcast with 91.5 WTBI-FM, with WTBI only providing coverage to the local Pickens County area, and B grade coverage to much of neighboring Greenville County. In 2020, the simulcast was broken after 30 years and 1540 AM became a Spanish religious station known as “Radio La Voz, 1540.”

References

External links
 WTBI-FM official website
 History of WTBI
 WTBI (Radio La Voz 1540) official website

TBI
Southern Gospel radio stations in the United States
TBI